is the 13th single by the Japanese idol girl group HKT48. It was released on April 22, 2020. The choreographic center is performed by Hirona Unjo.

This single was released in three different version, Type A, Type B and Theater Edition version. Every version contain a physical CD and DVD except the version of Theater Edition.

The single was ranked first regarding the first week sales based on Oricon and Billboard Japan Hot 100.

Release
This single is released a year after the group last single Ishi in 2019 and also the first single after the graduate member Rino Sashihara. The announcement of single releases was streamed through the group official SHOWROOM channel on March 7, 2020. Meanwhile, the track list of the single was announced a week later.

Track listing

Personnel

"3-2" 
"3-2" was performed by selection senbatsu performer, consisting of:
Team H: Yui Kojina, Meru Tashima, Miku Tanaka, Aki Toyonaga, Natsumi Matsuoka, Akari Watanabe
Team KIV: Hirona Unjo, Nene Jitoe, Anna Murashige, Aoi Motomura, Madoka Moriyasu
Team TII: Hana Matsuoka, Hinata Matsumoto, Emiri Yamashita
Kenkyuusei: Kaede Kamijima, Rimika Mizukami

"おしゃべりジュークボックス" (Oshaberi Jukebox) 
"おしゃべりジュークボックス" (Oshaberi Jukebox) was performed by HKT48 栄光のラビリンス CM選抜2020 (HKT48 Eikou no Labyrinth CM Senbatsu 2020), consisting of:
Team H: Yuka Akiyoshi, Haruka Ueno, Riko Sakaguchi, Meru Tashima, Aki Toyonaga, Akari Watanabe 
Team KIV: Nene Jitoe, Mai Fuchigami
Team TII: Misaki Aramaki, Ayaka Oda, Sae Kurihara, Moeka Sakai, Erena Sakamoto, Rio Shimizu, Tomoka Takeda
Kenkyuusei: Kaede Kamijima

"キスの花びら" (Kiss no Hanabira) 
"キスの花びら" (Kiss no Hanabira) was performed by Chou, consisting of:
Team H: Yui Kojina, Natsumi Matsuoka
Team KIV: Madoka Moriyasu
Team TII: Sae Kurihara, Hinata Matsumoto, Sono Miyazaki, Emiri Yamashita

"How about you?" 
"How about you?" was performed by Lit Charm, consisting of:
Team H: Haruka Ueno, Riko Sakaguchi
Team KIV: Mina Imada, Serina Kumazawa, Yuki Shimono, Aoi Motomura
Team TII: Maria Imamura, Hana Matsuoka
Kenkyuusei: Kurumi Takemoto

"青春の出口" (Seishun no Deguchi) 
"青春の出口" (Seishun no Deguchi) was performed by all active members of HKT48

References 

HKT48 songs
2020 singles
2020 songs
Songs written by Yasushi Akimoto